Gregorio Urrutia Venegas (1830 – September 10, 1897) was a Chilean military figure who played a major role in the later phase of the Occupation of Araucanía (1861–1883), leading Chilean forces that resisted and suppressed the Mapuche uprising of 1881. 

1830 births
1897 deaths
People from Punilla Province
Chilean people of Basque descent
Liberal Party (Chile, 1849) politicians
Deputies of the XXI Legislative Period of the National Congress of Chile
Deputies of the XXII Legislative Period of the National Congress of Chile
Chilean Army generals
People of the Occupation of Araucanía
Chilean military personnel of the War of the Pacific
People of the Chilean Civil War of 1891 (Congresistas)